Deoxyribonuclease X (Escherichia coli endodeoxyribonuclease, Escherichia coli endodeoxyribonuclease X) is an enzyme. This enzyme catalyses the following chemical reaction

 Endonucleolytic cleavage of supercoiled plasma DNA to linear DNA duplexes

This enzyme has preference for supercoiled DNA.

References

External links 
 

EC 3.1.22